Southern Justice is a 1917 silent drama film directed by Lynn Reynolds and starring Myrtle Gonzalez, George Hernandez and Jean Hersholt.

Cast
 Myrtle Gonzalez as Carolyn Dillon
 George Hernandez as Judge Morgan
 Jack Curtis as Roger Appleby
 Jean Hersholt as Caleb Talbot
 Charles Hill Mailes as Major Dillon 
 Fred Church as Ray Preston
 Elwood Bredell as Daws Anthony
 Maxfield Stanley as Wallace Turner
 George Marsh as Uncle Zeke

References

Bibliography
 Robert B. Connelly. The Silents: Silent Feature Films, 1910-36, Volume 40, Issue 2. December Press, 1998.

External links
 

1917 films
1917 drama films
1910s English-language films
American silent feature films
Silent American drama films
American black-and-white films
Universal Pictures films
Films directed by Lynn Reynolds
1910s American films
English-language drama films